The 1971 ICF Canoe Slalom World Championships were held in Meran, Italy under the auspices of International Canoe Federation for the second time. It was the 12th edition. The mixed C2 team event was discontinued following the 1969 championships. Meran hosted the championships previously in 1953, tying a record set both by Geneva, Switzerland (1949, 1959) and by Spittal, Austria (1963, 1965).

Medal summary

Men's

Canoe

Kayak

Mixed

Canoe

Women's

Kayak

Medals table

References
 Results
 International Canoe Federation
 

Icf Canoe Slalom World Championships, 1971
ICF Canoe Slalom World Championships
International sports competitions hosted by Italy
Icf Canoe Slalom World Championships, 1971